WWRM (94.9 MHz) is a commercial FM radio station licensed to Tampa, Florida, and serving the Tampa Bay area.  It has an adult contemporary radio format and is owned by Cox Media Group.    The studios and offices are located on 4th Street North in St. Petersburg.  It calls itself Magic 94.9.

WWRM has an effective radiated power (ERP) of 100,000 watts.  The transmitter tower is shared with WTSP, Tampa's CBS TV Network affiliate, off Rhodine Road in Riverview .

History

Top 40 era
On September 1, 1970, the station signed on as WLCY-FM, and was licensed to St. Petersburg.   It was put on the air by Rahall Communications, and was co-owned with WLCY and WLCY-TV.  The studios were in the "Rahall Color Communications Center" on Gandy Boulevard. During the early 1970s, WLCY-FM was an automated station, airing Drake-Chenault’s "Hit Parade" and TM's "Stereo Rock" formats.

Hoping to follow the sudden rise in popularity of local Top 40 station WRBQ-FM ("Q105") in the mid-1970s, WLCY-FM switched to live disc jockeys in 1976, using the moniker "Y95", using the whole-number frequency closest to 94.9. It soon adopted a new call sign, WYNF, a convenient shorthand for "Y-Ninety-Five".

Rock WYNF
In 1980, Taft Broadcasting bought the station and rebranded it "95FM--Florida's Best Rock". The music changed from Top 40 to AOR, to compete with the dominant local AOR station, WQXM. WYNF's studios moved from St. Petersburg to Tampa, at 504 Reo Street (near Tampa International Airport), home of Taft's WDAE. Two years later, the station was re-branded "95ynf".  WYNF began calling itself "The New 95".  Taft later became Great American Broadcasting.

In 1985, Great American Broadcasting sold WYNF to CBS Radio subsidiary Infinity Broadcasting.  The studios were relocated to 4th Street North in St. Petersburg at the Koger Executive Center. 95ynf dominated the Tampa Bay area for AOR music.  In the early 1980s, WYNF again became a sister station to Channel 10 (now WTSP) after Taft acquired Gulf Broadcasting. (Around that time, WDAE was sold to Gannett, while Taft acquired WSUN from Plough, Inc.)

Ron & Ron
After trying out several morning teams including Nick van Cleve and Jack Strapp, and later replacing van Cleve with Ron Diaz, program director Carey Curelop paired Diaz with local comic Ron Bennington, creating the popular Ron and Ron morning show at WYNF in the late nineteen-eighties. The show was successful in the Arbitron ratings and Ron & Ron became known as "Radio's Bad Boys."  Their agent Ross Reback helped them form The Ron & Ron Radio Network to own and syndicate the show to other FM stations.

The show's final broadcast on WYNF was on March 12, 1993. Reback became president and CEO of the newly formed network and negotiated deals to broadcast the show in Miami, Orlando and Jacksonville, with another dozen markets soon following (including a new more lucrative deal with WSUN).

Switch to WWRM

In 1993, Cox Broadcasting, owners of WWRM (then at 107.3, as "Warm 107"), bought WYNF, as part of a trade with CBS Radio, also involving stations in Dallas. The studios were relocated back to St. Petersburg at The Koger Center. By that point, rival rock station WXTB had surpassed WYNF in the Arbitron ratings, eventually forcing WYNF to make a format change.

On August 16, 1993, at 10 a.m., WYNF stopped playing rock music and began simulcasting WSUN's talk radio programming. Seven days later, Cox relocated the Soft Adult Contemporary format of "Warm 107" and its WWRM call sign to 94.9, becoming "Warm 94.9".

On January 5, 2001, the station had a minor overhaul, becoming "The New Magic 94.9", though keeping the format and WWRM call sign. (WWRM's old frequency at 107.3 has since become classic hits WXGL.)  WWRM evolved to more of a mainstream AC format by 2001, while its new sister station WDUV concentrated on the softer AC hits.  In May 2011, after ten years of being called "The New Magic 94.9", the station dropped "The New" in its name, becoming simply "Magic 94.9."  On December 26, 2011, WWRM changed its slogan to "80's, 90's, & now."

For many years as a Soft AC station, WWRM had played all-Christmas music for much of November and December.  Starting in November 2013, the all-Christmas music format shifted to sister station WDUV.  WWRM currently mixes some holiday songs in its usual playlist from Thanksgiving to Christmas.  When WBRN-FM became an adult contemporary station as WPBB in 2017, WWRM shifted its format a bit more uptempo, with fewer songs released before 2000 being played, while retaining the "Magic" branding. (WPBB has since become a classic rock station.) WWRM continues its 2000-now direction, in order to differentiate themselves from WDUV.

References

Radio Years, Central Florida's Great Radio Stations of the Past
Tampa Bay Radio History of WYNF FM 94.9

External links

WRM
Mainstream adult contemporary radio stations in the United States
Radio stations established in 1970
Cox Media Group
1970 establishments in Florida